Mahagi is a city of Ituri province in the Democratic Republic of the Congo. As of 2012, it had an estimated population of 19,399.

References 

Populated places in Ituri Province